Brown sauce is a British spiced condiment containing fruits and vinegar.

Brown sauce may also refer to:
 Brown Sauce (band), a 1981 British pop band
 Brown sauce (meat stock based), a sauce in French and Scandinavian cuisines

See also 
 Barbecue sauce
 Gravy
 Oyster sauce
 Soy sauce
 Steak sauce
 Teriyaki